Blues Brothers 2000: Original Motion Picture Soundtrack is a soundtrack album that features the Blues Brothers. It is a soundtrack album to the 1998 film, Blues Brothers 2000, the sequel to the 1980 film, The Blues Brothers.

In addition to tracks by the Blues Brothers Band performed with guest artists such as Aretha Franklin, James Brown, Dr. John, Lonnie Brooks, Junior Wells, Eddie Floyd and Wilson Pickett, there are songs by the Paul Butterfield Blues Band and Blues Traveler as well as an all-star blues supergroup, the Louisiana Gator Boys, featuring B.B. King, Eric Clapton, Bo Diddley, Charlie Musselwhite, Doctor John, Lou Rawls, Koko Taylor, Isaac Hayes, Billy Preston and other artists.

This is the first official Blues Brothers release to feature John Goodman, although his first performance as a member of the group occurred at the House of Blues in Los Angeles in 1995.

Track listing

Other songs in the film
In addition to the soundtrack, there are songs that appear in the film as background music that do not feature on the soundtrack. They include:
"Last Night" by the Blues Brothers Band - plays when Elwood and Buster drive through the city, to Willie's Strip Club
"Gumpstumper" by Ben Vaughan - plays during the car chase scene between Elwood, Mack, Buster and the Russian gangsters, after Willie's Strip Club is burnt down
"Honkytonk Dancing Machine" by Tracy Byrd - plays in the background of the scene at Bob's Country Kitchen
"Please Please Please" by James Brown and Blues Brothers - the lady is leaving at the end of the movie
"Checkin' Up on My Baby" by Junior Wells and Lonnie Brooks - at the last credits, Junior Wells sing in the film before he died, and Lonnie Brooks sing too with his guitar at Willie's Strip Club

Credits
 "Mighty" Mack McTeer (John Goodman) - vocals
 Buster Blues (J. Evan Bonifant) - vocals
 Cab Blues (Joe Morton) - vocals
 Elwood J. Blues (Dan Aykroyd) - vocals, blues harp
 Steve "the Colonel" Cropper - guitar
 Matt "Guitar" Murphy - lead guitar
 Donald "Duck" Dunn - bass 
 "Blue" Lou Marini - alt, tenor and baritone saxophone
 Alan "Mr. Fabulous" Rubin - trumpet
 Tom "Bones" Malone -  trombone, alto, tenor and baritone saxophone
 Birch "Crimson Slide" Johnson - trombone
 Paul "The Shiv" Shaffer - keyboards, producer
 Leon "The Lion" Pendarvis -  keyboards
 Murphy "Murph" Dunne -  keyboards
 Anton Fig - drums
 Steve Potts - drums
 Willie "Too Big" Hall - drums
 John Popper - harmonica

Certifications

References

External links
 Album page at Blues Brothers Central

The Blues Brothers albums
1998 soundtrack albums
1990s film soundtrack albums
Universal Records soundtracks
Musical film soundtracks
Comedy film soundtracks